North High School is a public high school in Eastlake, Ohio.  It is one of two high schools in the Willoughby-Eastlake City School District. The school was created when the Willoughby Union High School was split into North High School and South High School. At the beginning of the 2019 school year, North opened their new high school on the site of the former baseball fields.  The old North was razed and new baseball fields and practice fields for soccer and football were built on the site.

About 20 minutes east of Cleveland, Eastlake North High School is located close to Classic Park, home of the Lake County Captains. The current enrollment is approximately 1200 students.  The principal is Eric Frei.

Athletics
Eastlake North is a member of the Ohio High School Athletic Association and part of the Western Reserve Conference.

Notable alumni

Dennis Wojtanowski - Class of 1968 - co-founder of the Columbus, Ohio-based nonprofit organization Democratic Voices
Lorraine Fende - Class of 1974 - County Treasurer for Lake County, Ohio
Tom Bukovac - Class of 1987 - Nashville session guitarist
Jason Griffith - Class of 1999 - American actor and voice actor, voice of Sonic the Hedgehog from 2003 to 2010
Stipe Miocic - Class of 2000 - former UFC Heavyweight Champion

References

External links
https://www.weschools.org/northhighschool_home.aspx

High schools in Lake County, Ohio
Public high schools in Ohio
1957 establishments in Ohio
Educational institutions established in 1957